Baron Bradbury, of Winsford in the County of Chester, is a title in the Peerage of the United Kingdom. It was created on 28 January 1925 for the economist and public servant Sir John Bradbury. He was Joint Permanent Secretary to the Treasury from 1913 to 1919 and considered to be the British government's chief economic adviser during the First World War.  the title is held by his grandson, the third Baron, who succeeded his father in 1994.

Barons Bradbury (1925)
John Swanwick Bradbury, 1st Baron Bradbury (1872–1950)
John Bradbury, 2nd Baron Bradbury (1914–1994)
John Bradbury, 3rd Baron Bradbury (b. 1940)

The heir apparent is the present holder's son John Timothy Bradbury (b. 1973)

Arms

References

Kidd, Charles, Williamson, David (editors). Debrett's Peerage and Baronetage (1990 edition). New York: St Martin's Press, 1990.

Baronies in the Peerage of the United Kingdom
Noble titles created in 1925